Isabel Edie Coe (1951–2012) was a Wiradjuri woman born at Erambie Mission near Cowra, and one of the most prominent Australian Aboriginal leaders.

Activism
Coe was one of the activists who monitored police brutality and harassment against Aboriginal people, which led to the establishment of the Aboriginal Legal Service (ALS) in 1970.

She had a lead role in the running of the original Aboriginal Tent Embassy in Canberra, and was the lead litigant in Isabel Coe v the Commonwealth (1993), where she unsuccessfully tried to force the Australian government to recognise the sovereignty of the Wiradjuri nation.

Family
She was the sister of prominent activists Paul Coe and Jenny Munro, and was married to Billy Craigie, one of the co-founders of the Aboriginal Tent Embassy, who died in 1998.

References

1951 births
Australian indigenous rights activists
Wiradjuri people
2012 deaths
Australian civil rights activists
Women civil rights activists